Several ships have been named Archimedes for Archimedes:

 was launched at Sunderland. She traded between England and the Baltic until the British government chartered her as a transport c.1809. She was lost in December 1811 while coming back from the Baltic.
 was a steamship built in Britain in 1839, and the world's first steamship to be driven by a screw propeller.
In 1867 and 1868 she laid telegraph cables between Denmark and Norway and Denmark and England.
The next year the Liverpool, Brazil & River Plate Steam Navigation purchased her and named her Archimedes. The Admiralty requisitioned her during WWI and she served as a supply ship from 1914-1919. In 1932 Ben Line Steamers purchased her and renamed her Benmacdhui. She hit a mine in 1941 and sank of Spurn Head.

See also
Italian submarine Archimede, either of two submarines by that name

Ship names